In mathematics education, concept image and concept definition are two ways of understanding a mathematical concept.

They define a concept image as such:
"We shall use the term concept image to describe the total cognitive structure that is associated with the concept, which includes all the mental pictures and associated properties and processes. It is built up over the years through experiences of all kinds, changing as the individual meets new stimuli and matures."
A concept definition is similar to the usual notion of a definition in mathematics, with the distinction that it is personal to an individual:
"a personal concept definition can differ from a formal concept definition, the latter being a concept definition which is accepted by the mathematical community at large."

Bibliography

References

External links
David Tall - CONCEPT IMAGE AND CONCEPT DEFINITION

Mathematics education
Definition